The arrátel was the base unit of weight in the Portuguese customary measurement system. Until the adoption of the metric system in the 19th century, the arrátel was used in Portugal, Brazil and other parts of the Portuguese Empire.

The real value of the arrátel fluctuated during the Middle Ages. Before king Pedro I, the main arrátel seems to have been an arrátel of 12.5 ounces. With Pedro I, the official arrátel increased to 14 ounces. Finally, the Portuguese arrátel was fixed at 16 ounces by decree of King Manuel I in 1499. This arrátel, which was kept as the national standard until the introduction of the metric system, was similar to the Spanish libra.

Arratel values
 13th century: Arratel = 12½ onças (ounces) = 25/32 libras = 0,3596 kg;
 15th century: Arratel = 14 onças = 0,4025 kg;
 1499: Arratel = 16 onças = 1 libra = 1,011 Avoirdupois pound = 0,4590 kg.

See also
Portuguese customary units
Pound (mass)

References

Units of mass